The Mollie Kathleen Gold Mine is a historic vertical shaft mine near Cripple Creek, Colorado. The mine shaft descends  into the mountain, a depth roughly equal to the height of the Empire State Building in New York City. The mine currently gives tours, and is visited by around 40,000 people annually. The addition of the mines and subsequent tours of this mine and others in the area had considerable effect on the economies of both Victor, Colorado and Cripple Creek.

History
The mine was started in 1891 on a mining claim staked by Mollie Kathleen Gortner, after whom the mine was named.

Other than a government-ordered hiatus during World War II, the mine operated continuously until 1961; since then it has continued as a tourist attraction.

See also
 Gold mining in Colorado

References

External links
 Mollie Kathleen Gold Mine Tour

Gold mines in Colorado
Colorado Mining Boom
Underground mines in the United States
Mining museums in Colorado
Museums in Teller County, Colorado
Buildings and structures in Teller County, Colorado
History of Teller County, Colorado